Secret Bridesmaids' Business is a 2019 six-part Australian television miniseries, produced by Seven Studios for the Seven Network.

Synopsis 
Olivia's perfect wedding turns deadly after one of her bridesmaids unknowingly invites a malevolent stranger into their lives, triggering a deadly chain reaction that blows open a hidden world of secrets.

Cast

Main 
 Abbie Cornish as Melanie Heyward
 Katie McGrath as Saskia de Merindol
 Georgina Haig as Olivia Cotterill
 Alexander England as Jakob Novak
 Dan Spielman as Michael Heyward
 Oliver Ackland as Alex Blake
 Annie Jones as Colleen Cotterill
 Nicholas Bell as Bill Cotterill

Recurring 
 Jacquie Brennan as Kerri Lane 
 Artemis Ioannides as Uzmma
 Jackson Tozer as Oscar 
 Emily Taheny as Nicole
 Hannah Bath as Janine

Episodes

References

External links
 

Australian drama television series
2010s Australian television miniseries
Seven Network original programming
Television shows set in Sydney
2019 Australian television series debuts
2019 Australian television series endings
2010s Australian crime television series
Australian LGBT-related television shows